This is a list of FIFA Women's World Cup mascots.

List of Mascots

See also
List of FIFA World Cup official mascots

References 

Women's World Cup
Mascots